Thoms Runcorn  was a  Welsh Anglican priest in the 16th century.

Gwynn was educated at the University of Oxford. He held livings at Bowden, Cheshire, Llanrhaiadr, Bebington and Weaverham. Runcorn was Archdeacon of Bangor from 1525 until hid death in 1556.

Footnotes

References

Alumni of the University of Oxford
Archdeacons of Bangor
1556 deaths
16th-century Welsh Anglican priests